Patterson is a city in Woodruff County, Arkansas, United States. The population was 452 at the 2010 census.

Geography

According to the United States Census Bureau, the town has a total area of 2.8 km (1.1 mi2), all land.

Demographics

2020 census

As of the 2020 United States Census, there were 310 people, 207 households, and 120 families residing in the city.

2000 census
As of the census of 2000, there were 467 people, 195 households, and 127 families residing in the town.  The population density was 163.9/km (422.9/mi2).  There were 237 housing units at an average density of 83.2/km (214.6/mi2).  The racial makeup of the town was 2.23% White, 90.34% Black or African American, 1.28% Native American, 0.21% Pacific Islander, 1.71% from other races, and 0.21% from two or more races.  1.71% of the population were Hispanic or Latino of any race.

There were 195 households, out of which 21.5% had children under the age of 18 living with them, 48.7% were married couples living together, 12.8% had a female householder with no husband present, and 34.4% were non-families. 33.3% of all households were made up of individuals, and 14.9% had someone living alone who was 65 years of age or older.  The average household size was 2.39 and the average family size was 3.02.

In the town the population was spread out, with 22.9% under the age of 18, 8.1% from 18 to 24, 24.2% from 25 to 44, 25.1% from 45 to 64, and 19.7% who were 65 years of age or older.  The median age was 41 years. For every 100 females, there were 100.4 males.  For every 100 females age 18 and over, there were 95.7 males.

The median income for a household in the town was $17,308, and the median income for a family was $21,250. Males had a median income of $25,313 versus $17,750 for females. The per capita income for the town was $12,532.  About 24.7% of families and 31.0% of the population were below the poverty line, including 39.4% of those under age 18 and 30.3% of those age 65 or over.

References

Cities in Woodruff County, Arkansas
Cities in Arkansas